Highway 12 is a major highway in the Canadian province of Saskatchewan. It begins in Saskatoon at the intersection of Idylwyld Drive and Highway 11 north (formerly beginning further south at the intersection with 22nd Street), initially running north on Idylwyld Drive concurrently with Highway 11 and Highway 16. Just outside Saskatoon's northern city limits, Highway 11 exits northeast from Idylwyld Drive and Highway 12 begins and travels north, passing through the city of Martensville. Highway 12 cross the North Saskatchewan River over Petrofka Bridge and passes through the town of Blaine Lake and intersects highway Highway 40, finally terminating at Highway 3 near Shell Lake.

History
Provincial Highway 12 was originally the designated route which connected Saskatoon and Prince Albert, following present-day Highway 12 to the Hepburn area, then following present-day Highway 312 to Rosthern, before continuing northwest to Prince Albert. In the mid-1950s, the route was renumbered to Highway 11; however, in the 1960s Highway 11 was realigned to follow a more direct route to Rosthern through Warman and Hague. Combined with the opening of the Petrofka Bridge in 1962, Highway 12 was revived and went to Highway 40 at Blaine Lake. In the 1970s, Highway 12 was extended north to Shell Lake.

Major intersections 
From west to east:

References 

012
Martensville
Streets in Saskatoon